Eunidia fuscostictica is a species of beetle in the family Cerambycidae. It was described by Stephan von Breuning in 1939.

Subspecies
 Eunidia fuscostictica evansi Téocchi, 1989
 Eunidia fuscostictica fuscostictica Breuning, 1939

References

Eunidiini
Beetles described in 1939